Marcia Hathaway (19301963) was an Australian actress.

Hathaway worked extensively in theatre and on Sydney radio.

She died after being attacked by a Bull shark in shallow water at Sugarloaf Bay, Middle Harbour, Sydney, on January 28, 1963.

Select Credits
Shadow of the Boomerang (1960)
Harlequinade (1961)

References

External links
Marcia Hathaway at Ausstage
Marcia Hathaway at IMDb

1930 births
1963 deaths
20th-century Australian actresses
Deaths due to shark attacks